Grande Autane is a 2,782 m mountain in the Dauphiné Alps close to the cities of Gap and Ancelle in the département of Hautes-Alpes in France.

External links 
 Grande Autane at summitpost.org (Overview of High Dauphiné, category Tête de Vautisse group)

Mountains of Hautes-Alpes
Mountains of the Alps